The Tourist Railway Association Inc. (TRAIN) was a non-profit organization dedicated to promoting the tourist railway industry in the United States.

It published a monthly newsletter, Trainline. TRAIN conducted periodic seminars and conventions in various parts of the country to disseminate information about various issues affecting tourist railways, such as insurance, regulations, fund raising, marketing, operations, volunteers, passenger car restoration, maintenance, and safety programs.

Since there is overlap in the interests of tourist railroads and railway preservation, TRAIN and the Association of Railway Museums (ARM) began a program of holding joint conferences every five years.  The most recent being the 2011 ARM-TRAIN conference hosted by the Tennessee Valley Railroad Museum.

In 2011, it was decided to actually merge ARM and TRAIN into one organization.

See also 
 Association of Railway Museums

Heritage railroads in the United States
Railway service companies of the United States
Railway associations
Tourism agencies